The RepRap Fisher, also known as the RepRap Fisher Delta is an open-source fused deposition modeling 3D printer and is part of the RepRap project. The RepRap Fisher is named after the English statistician and biologist Ronald Fisher, it was designed by RepRapPro.

The RepRap Fisher has a 150mm diameter by 180mm height build volume, uses a Bowden extruder and has a print resolution of 12.5 um in all directions, it also has a micro SD card and USB and Ethernet connections allowing it to be connected to a network. The printer was released at a notably low price. It was only available in kit form.

See also
 RepRap Ormerod
 Prusa i3

References

External links 
 RepRap Ltd Fisher kits
 eMaker RepRap Fisher kits
 RepRap Fisher page on RepRap.org 
 Open Source repository on Github by eMaker
 Open Source repository on Github by RepRapPro (no longer under active development)

Open hardware electronic devices
3D printers
RepRap project